Bellis is a genus of flowering plants in the family Asteraceae.

Bellis may also refer to:

Bellis (surname)
Bellis, Alberta, hamlet in Alberta, Canada
Belgian minehunter Bellis (M916), Tripartite-class minehunter of the Belgian Naval Component

See also
Belli